On 14 February 2023, an "aerial object that looked like a weather balloon" was spotted flying at approximately  in southeastern Romania. Two MiG 21 Lancer fighter jets were scrambled to the area, but returned to base after not receiving visual or radar confirmation of the alleged object.

The same day, the neighboring nation of Moldova closed its airspace to investigate a "balloon-like object" allegedly spotted in the north of the country, near its border with Ukraine. After it was declared that there was no danger to civilians, the airspace was reopened an hour and twenty-two minutes later.

Incidents
At around 12.30 p.m. on 14 February, the air surveillance systems of the Romanian Air Force detected a small-sized aerial target similar to a weather balloon flying at an altitude of 11,000 meters over the South-East of Romania. Two MiG-21 LanceRs under NATO Air Policing command were scrambled from the 86th Air Base. The two fighters could not identify the target, neither visually nor on radar. The aircraft remained in the area for 30 minutes before returning to base.

Around the same time, a similar object was detected over Moldova, near the city of Soroca. Due to the adverse weather conditions and the inability of tracking and identifying the object, the decision was taken to close the air space at 13.24 p.m. for safety reasons. The air space was opened again an hour later.

See also
List of high-altitude object events in 2023

References

2023 in military history
February 2023 events in Moldova
February 2023 events in Romania
Unidentified flying objects